Dave Shea is a Canadian web designer and co-author of The Zen of CSS Design: Visual Enlightenment for the Web.

He is known for his work in web-standard development—from his design community project CSS Zen Garden to his active contributions at the Web Standards Project (WaSP). Shea is also a writer “for a large global audience of web designers and developers on his popular blog, Mezzoblue” Dave Shea - WaSP Member, emphasis on original. The Web Standard Project and is the founder and creative director of Bright Creative in Vancouver, BC.

Publications
Along with co-authoring his own book with Molly E. Holzschlag, Shea has contributed to online magazines Digital Web Magazine and A List Apart. His web work has been featured in publications such as Page Magazine, Stylesheet Stylebook, Linux Format Magazine, PIXELmag, and DMXZone

Award(s)
Shea was awarded Best of Show 2004 at the South by Southwest Interactive conference in Austin, TX.

Interviews
 Digital Web Interviews Dave Shea
 CSS Beauty - Dave Shea Audio Interview

See also
 CSS Zen Garden
 Cascading Style Sheets

References

External links
CSS Zen Garden
Bright Creative Web Studio

Year of birth missing (living people)
Living people
Web designers
Web developers